"Last Night Again" is a song written by Steel Magnolia members Joshua Scott Jones and Meghan Linsey, along with Hillary Lindsey. The song was recorded by Steel Magnolia for their self-titled debut album. The song is the third single from the album, and was sent to country radio on December 6, 2010. It was officially released on iTunes the next day. It debuted on the Hot Country Songs charts at number 59 for the Billboard chart week ending January 1, 2011.

Critical reception 
Bobby Peacock of Roughstock gave the song four stars out of five. He thought that the duo's real-life chemistry was far more evident in this song than it was on "Keep On Lovin' You". He also went on to add that he could see it as being a sequel to Lady Antebellum's "Lookin' for a Good Time".

Music video 
The video, which was directed by Peter Zavadil, was released in December 2010. In the video, the members of Steel Magnolia are shown in a bowling alley, facing off against one another in efforts to impress the other.

Chart performance 
"Last Night Again" debuted at number 59 on the U.S. Billboard Hot Country Songs charts for the week ending January 1, 2011.

Year-end charts

References 

2010 singles
2010 songs
Steel Magnolia songs
Song recordings produced by Dann Huff
Songs written by Hillary Lindsey
Music videos directed by Peter Zavadil
Big Machine Records singles